Annopole may refer to:

Annopole, Środa Wielkopolska County
Annopole, Złotów County
Annopole Stare
Annopole Nowe